Trick Shooting with Kenne Duncan was a promotional film directed by Ed Wood. Total run time is nine minutes and was produced c. 1952-1953. It consists of Kenne Duncan performing trick shooting stunts and showcasing firearms made by Remington Arms. Duncan had become known as a villain for B-movie Westerns and the film was an attempt to capitalize on his fame.

The rifles showcased were a Remington Model 552 and a Remington Nylon 66. The film includes posters and advertisements of Duncan performing at state fairs and nightclubs, and also still pictures from his roles in Westerns. A sequence features newsreel footage of his visit and performances in Japan.

Sources

References

External links
 
 

1953 films
Films directed by Ed Wood
Films with screenplays by Ed Wood
Films about actors
Films about shooting sports
Promotional films
1950s English-language films